Herki, also spelled Harki is a large tribe in Kurdistan. The largest part of this tribe live in Iraqi Kurdistan and a significant number live in Iranian Kurdistan. They are also found in Northern Kurdistan.

Sub-tribes
The Herkis are divided in three sub-tribes: Menda, Sida and Serhati.

History
According to tradition, the Herkis descend from a man named Babekr Agha.

There are claims, however, like that of Dr.Zirar Siddiq Tewfiq, author of the book The Kurdish Tribes and Tribal Leaders in the Middle Ages, believes that the Harkis were present in the middle ages, possibly as 'Arji'. It seems that the Arji dwelt around Amadiya during the Abbasid period. An attested individual who belonged to the Arji is a man named Baw Al-Arji, who was one of Abu'l-Haija bin Abdullah Al-Hakkari's men, a contemporary of Imad al-Din Zengi. 

, in his work , states that it was affirmed to him by a Herki leader that the Herkis are originally a branch of the Milli tribes. He also added that the Herkis are mentioned in the 19th century work Seyâhatnâme-i hudûd.

Language
The Herki dialect belongs to the Kurmanji vernacular.

Lifestyle
The Herkis lived mostly a nomadic life with their herds; however, this changed a lot after 1920 and the Treaty of Sèvres. The new hand-drawn borders of Iran, Iraq, Syria and Turkey hindered Kurdish tribes to continue their way of life.

In 1989 they counted some 20,000 people, living between Urmia and Rawanduz, one of the largest remaining groups of pastoral herders. On their regular movement they brought salt from Iran to Iraq and carried wheat and barley back to Iran.

The Herkis were a very well-armed tribe, and were noted to be good warriors and fierce men. Some of their women would occationally be seen fighting alongside men. Herkis used to practice pillaging, for example, there was a continuous rivalry between a Herki chieftain named Tahir Agha and Muhammad Saeed Beg of Bradost, over 400 goats the earlier looted from the latter.

References

Kurdish tribes